Stan or STAN may refer to:

People
 Stan (given name), a list of people with the given name
 Stan Laurel (1890–1965), English comic actor, part of duo Laurel and Hardy
 Stan (surname), a Romanian surname
 Stan! (born 1964), American author, cartoonist and games designer Steven Brown
 Stan (singer) (born 1987), Greek singer born Stratos Antipariotis
 MC Stan, Indian rapper

Arts and entertainment

Fictional characters
 Stan, an alligator in the 2006 Disney animated film The Wild
 Grunkle Stan, in the animated TV series Gravity Falls
 Stan, in the 2009 American fantasy comedy movie 17 Again
 Stan, from the film Crawl
 Stan Beeman, in the TV series The Americans
 Stan Carter, in the British soap opera EastEnders
 Stan Edgar, in the Amazon Prime Video series The Boys
 Stan Gable, in the Revenge of the Nerds film series played by Ted McGinley
 Stan Marsh, in the animated TV series South Park
 Stan Ogden, in the British soap opera Coronation Street
 Stan Pembroke, in the American sitcom television series Charles in Charge
 Stan Smith (American Dad!), in the animated TV series American Dad!
 Stan (Monkey Island), a salesman in the Monkey Island adventure games

Music
 "Stan" (song), a 2000 song by Eminem, featuring Dido from The Marshall Mathers LP
 Stan (fan), slang for a fan, often of celebrity culture and sometimes used in a negative way
 Stan (EP), by Stan Walker, 2018

Science and technology
 Hurricane Stan, a 2005 hurricane
 Stanhopea (abbreviation Stan), an orchid genus
 Stan (dinosaur), a Tyrannosaurus rex fossil found at the Hell Creek Formation, South Dakota, US

Technology
 ST segment, analysis in electrocardiography
 Stan (service), an Australian streaming service
 Stan (software), a programming language for statistical inference
 System Trace Audit Number, a key to uniquely identify a card transaction based on the ISO 8583 standard

Organisations
 Stan, an Australian streaming video service
 STAN (art-group), a Ukrainian cultural organisation
 Mayors and Independents (Czech: Starostové a nezávislí), a political party in the Czech Republic
 Sekolah Tinggi Akuntansi Negara, a state college in Indonesia
 Standard Chartered (stock market symbol), British multinational banking and financial services company

Other uses
 Stan (horse), a British-American Thoroughbred racehorse
 -stan, a Persian suffix meaning "home of", "place of" or "country"
 Stan, Mirna, a settlement in Slovenia
 Sino-Tibetan-Austronesian, a proposed language family
 Stan (administrative unit), a historical administrative unit in Russia

See also
 Stan Twitter, a community of Twitter users
 Stanley (disambiguation)
 Stanly (disambiguation)
 Stano (disambiguation)
 Stanton (disambiguation)